2016 in continental European music in geographical order.

Events

13 February – All four members of British rock band Viola Beach, and their manager, are killed when their car crashes off a bridge and into a river in Södertälje, Sweden.
22 April –  is forced to withdraw from the Eurovision Song Contest because of failure to repay an old debt. 
14 May –  win the Eurovision Song Contest, in Stockholm, Sweden, with the song "1944", performed by Jamala.

Scandinavia
Main article for Scandinavian music in 2016

Denmark
Main article for Danish music in 2016
Denmark in the Eurovision Song Contest 2016
Danish #1s

Finland
Main article for Finnish music in 2016
Finland in the Eurovision Song Contest 2016
Finnish #1 singles2015, #1 albums

Norway
Main article for Norwegian music in 2016
Norway in the Eurovision Song Contest 2016
Norway charts

Sweden
Main article for Swedish music in 2016
Sweden in the Eurovision Song Contest 2016
Swedish #1 singles and albums

Netherlands
Dutch #1 singles

Ireland
Main article for Irish music in 2016

UK
Main article for British music in 2016

Germany
German number ones
EFF, a project of Felix Jaehn is immediately successful with their first single "Stimme".
Kurdish-German rapper Azad, Bosse, Schiller, AnnenMayKantereit, all have #1 albums.

Switzerland and Austria
Swiss #1s

France
French #1s
Imany has a European hit with "Don't be so shy", with a #1 in Germany, Austria, Poland and Russia.

Italy
Italian number ones

Eastern Europe/ Balkans
List of Polish #1 singles
Czech #1 singles
Hungarian #1 singles

Deaths
2 January – Michel Delpech, French singer-songwriter and actor, 69
9 January – Jānis Vaišļa, Latvian musician (Pirates of the Sea), 46 (cardiac amyloidosis)
6 February – Eddy Wally, Belgian singer, 83
21 February – Piotr Grudziński, 40, Polish guitarist (Riverside).
22 February – Hans Reffert, German musician and composer, 69
23 February – Johnny Murphy, Irish musician and actor (The Commitments), 72 
5 March – Nikolaus Harnoncourt, Austrian conductor and cellist, 86
5 March – François-Eudes Chanfrault, French composer, 41
22 April — Ojārs Grīnbergs, Latvian singer, 73
26 April – Gabriele Sima, Austrian opera singer, 61
29 April – Dmytro Hnatyuk, Ukrainian operatic baritone, 91
11 May – Peter Behrens, German drummer, actor, musician, and clown, 68
17 May – Huguette Dreyfus, French harpsichordist, 87Huguette Dreyfus, 87, French harpsichordist.
2 June – Corry Brokken, Dutch singer, Eurovision Song Contest 1957 winner, 83
26 July – Roye Albrighton, German musician (Nektar), 67
27 July – Einojuhani Rautavaara, Finnish composer, 87
7 August – Dolores Vargas, Spanish singer, 80
22 August – Toots Thielemans, Belgian jazz musician, 94

References

External links
 European Music Council 

2016 in music